Kelly Paige Bechard (born January 22, 1978) is a women's ice hockey player. Bechard competed for Canada at the World Championships in 2000 and 2001. In 2002, she competed for Canada at the Winter Olympics in Salt Lake City. Born in Sedley, Saskatchewan, Bechard was also a provincial doubles badminton champion in High School.

In the gold medal game, Bechard was called for a tripping penalty late in the third period, and this led to Karyn Bye of the United States scoring a goal. The goal made the score 3-2 in Canada’s favour, as Bechard was part of the first Canadian Women's Hockey Gold Medal hockey team in Olympic history.

After the Olympics, Bechard returned to the University of Calgary, where she played for the university’s hockey team, and pursued a degree in management. From 2010-2014 she was assistant coach for the university of Calgary Dino’s, she took over head coach for the 2013/14 season. After that she left to be the assistant coach for the Calgary Inferno for their 2017/18 season. Bechard is now back as an assistant coach for the university of Calgary Dino’s    In 1998, she was named to the CIAU’s First All-Star team and was presented the Award of Merit. She also played for Calgary’s Oval X-Treme and the Brampton Thunder. She scored a goal in the 2003 Esso Women's National Hockey Championship to help Team Alberta win the Abby Hoffman Cup.

References

1978 births
Brampton Thunder players
Calgary Oval X-Treme players
Canadian women's ice hockey forwards
Ice hockey people from Saskatchewan
Ice hockey players at the 2002 Winter Olympics
Living people
Medalists at the 2002 Winter Olympics
Olympic gold medalists for Canada
Olympic medalists in ice hockey